The following is a timeline of franchise evolution in Major League Baseball. The histories of franchises in the National Association of Base Ball Players (NABBP), National Association of Professional Base Ball Players (NA), Union Association (UA), and American Association (AA) before they joined the National League are also included.  In 1900 the minor league Western League renamed itself the American League (AL).  All of the 1899 Western League teams were a part of the transformation with the Saint Paul Apostles moving to Chicago and to play as the White Stockings.  In 1901 the AL declared itself a Major League.  For its inaugural major league season the AL dropped its teams in Indianapolis, Buffalo and Minneapolis and replaced them with franchises in Boston, Philadelphia, and Baltimore and the Kansas City Blues moved to Washington to play as the Senators.

In 2020, Major League Baseball designated seven Negro Leagues from 1920–1948 as major leagues. 

The timeline has not yet been fully updated to reflect that designation (in addition, the timeline does not include any non-National League/American League teams which existed at the Major League level from 1876 to 1915).

MLB timeline
The first line is the formation of the National League in 1876, and the second is the transformation of the American League to a major league in 1901. The third line is the beginning of the expansion era in 1961.

World Series championships are shown with a "*", National League Pennants before the World Series are shown with a "^", and American League Pennants before the World Series "#". No World Series was played in 1904, so the pennant winners for each league are indicated. Due to the 1994-95 Major League Baseball strike, there were no pennant winners or World Series in 1994, so this year is left blank.

History of organizational changes
Source: 

Note: Team names are given here according to the convention used by The Baseball Encyclopedia, which regularized them into the familiar form of modern team names. However, most teams in the early period had no name, aside from that of the club (as in "Hartford Base Ball Club" or "Athletic Base Ball Club of Philadelphia"), and nicknames like "Beaneaters," "Perfectos" and the many allusions to uniform colors were inventions by the florid sportswriters of the day.

Pre-modern Era (1876–1900)

1876: Founding of the National League 
The National League is established with eight clubs.

1877 
 New York and Philadelphia are expelled from the NL.
 The Hartford Dark Blues move from Hartford, Connecticut, to Brooklyn and are renamed the Brooklyn Hartfords.

1878 
 Brooklyn, Louisville, and St. Louis fold.
 Indianapolis, Milwaukee, and Providence join the NL.

1879 
 Indianapolis and Milwaukee fold.
 Buffalo, Cleveland, Syracuse, and Troy join the NL.

1880 
 Syracuse folds.
 The Cincinnati Reds disband and are replaced by an entirely different club in the city, the Cincinnati Stars.
 Worcester joins the NL.

1881 
 The NL expels Cincinnati after the club refuses to sign a league-wide pledge to ban alcohol at ballparks.
 Detroit joins the NL.

1882: Establishment of the American Association 
The American Association (AA) is established with six clubs.

1883 
 The Troy Trojans and Worcester Worcesters fold.
 The New York Gothams and Philadelphia Quakers join the NL.
 The Columbus Buckeyes and New York Metropolitans join the AA.
 The Boston Red Caps are renamed the Boston Beaneaters.
 The St. Louis Brown Stockings are renamed the St. Louis Browns.

1884: The Union Association as a third league 
 The Union Association (UA) is established with 12 clubs.
 The AA expands to 13 clubs with the addition of the Brooklyn Atlantics, Indianapolis Hoosiers, Richmond Virginians, Toledo Blue Stockings, and Washington Nationals.

1885: Back to two leagues 
 The Union Association (UA) disbands.
 The former UA club St. Louis Maroons joins the NL.
 Both the Cleveland Blues of the NL and the Columbus Buckeyes of the AA fold.
 The AA contracts to 8 teams, with the Indianapolis Hoosiers, Richmond Virginians, Toledo Blue Stockings, and Washington Nationals either folding or returning to the minor leagues.
 The New York Gothams become the New York Giants.
 The Brooklyn Atlantics become the Brooklyn Grays.
 The Louisville Eclipse become the Louisville Colonels.

1886 
 The Buffalo Bisons transfer from the NL into minor league baseball.
 The Providence Grays fold.
 The Kansas City Cowboys and a new Washington Nationals club join the NL.

1887 
 The Kansas City Cowboys fold.
 The St. Louis Maroons move from St. Louis to Indianapolis to become a new Indianapolis Hoosiers club.
 The Pittsburgh Alleghenys transfer from the AA to the NL.
 A new Cleveland Blues club joins the AA.

1888 
 The Brooklyn Grays are renamed the Brooklyn Bridegrooms.
 The New York Metropolitans fold.
 A new Kansas City Cowboys club joins the AA.

1889 
 The Detroit Wolverines fold.
 The Cleveland Blues transfer from the AA to the NL and become the Cleveland Spiders.
 The Columbus Solons join the AA.

1890: The Players' League as a third league 
 The Players' League (PL) is established with 8 clubs.
 The Chicago White Stockings are renamed the Chicago Colts.
 The Philadelphia Quakers are renamed the Philadelphia Phillies.
 The Brooklyn Bridegrooms transfer from the AA to the NL.
 The Cincinnati Red Stockings transfer from the AA to the NL and are renamed the Cincinnati Reds.
 The Indianapolis Hoosiers, Kansas City Cowboys, and Washington Nationals fold.
 The Baltimore Orioles transfer from the AA into minor league baseball, and are replaced by the Brooklyn Gladiators. The Gladiators then folded midway through the 1890 season, and the Orioles returned to the AA to finish out the season.
 The Rochester Broncos, Syracuse Stars, and Toledo Maumees also join the AA.

1891: Last AA season 
 The Players' League (PL) disbands.
 The Brooklyn Bridegrooms are renamed the Brooklyn Grooms.
 The Pittsburgh Alleghenys are renamed the Pittsburgh Pirates.
 The Boston Reds of the former PL join the AA.
 The AA's Philadelphia Athletics are expelled from the league and are replaced by the former PL's Philadelphia Athletics.
 The Cincinnati Kelly's Killers join the AA. The club then folded midway through the 1891 season and are replaced by the minor league team Milwaukee Brewers.
 The Washington Statesman join the AA.

1892: NL monopoly 
 The AA folds, leaving only the NL.
 Four former AA clubs (Baltimore, Louisville, St. Louis, and Washington) join the NL.
 The Washington Statesmen become known as the Washington Senators.

1896 
The Brooklyn Grooms revert back to the Brooklyn Bridegrooms.

1898 
The Chicago Colts become known as the Chicago Orphans.

1899 
 The Brooklyn Bridegrooms become known as the Brooklyn Superbas.
 The St. Louis Browns become known as the St. Louis Perfectos.

1900: Classic Eight 
 The NL contracts to eight clubs, with the folding of Baltimore, Cleveland, Louisville, and Washington. This eight-team lineup in the NL remained unchanged through 1952.
 The St. Louis Perfectos are renamed the St. Louis Cardinals.

Birth of the Modern Era & Negro Major Leagues (1901–1946)

1901: Founding of the American League 
The American League is established with its own eight clubs.

1902 
The Milwaukee Brewers move to St. Louis and become the St. Louis Browns.

1903 
 The Baltimore Orioles fold. 
 The New York Highlanders are enfranchised.
 The Cleveland Bluebirds are renamed the Cleveland Naps.
 The Chicago Orphans are renamed the Chicago Cubs.

1904 
The Chicago White Stockings are renamed the Chicago White Sox.

1907 
The Boston Beaneaters are renamed the Boston Doves.

1908 
The Boston Americans are renamed the Boston Red Sox.

1911 
 The Boston Doves are renamed the Boston Rustlers.
 The Brooklyn Superbas are renamed the Brooklyn Trolley Dodgers.

1912 
The Boston Rustlers are renamed the Boston Braves.

1913 
 The New York Highlanders are renamed the New York Yankees.
 The Brooklyn Trolley Dodgers are renamed the Brooklyn Dodgers.

1914 
 The Federal League declares itself as a "third major league" with its own eight teams, in competition with the established National and American Leagues.
 The Brooklyn Dodgers are renamed the Brooklyn Robins.

1915 
 The Cleveland Naps are renamed the Cleveland Indians.
 The Buffalo Buffeds are renamed the Buffalo Blues.
 The Chicago Federals are renamed the Chicago Whales.
 The Indianapolis Hoosiers relocate to Newark, New Jersey, to become the Newark Peppers.

1916 
The Federal League folds prior to the season.

1920: Establishment of first Negro National League 

The first Negro National League is formed with eight clubs, the first black baseball league to be designated a major league.

1921 
Dayton departs the NNL as an independent team.
Columbus joins the NNL.
The Cuban Stars are renamed the Cincinnati Cuban Stars.

1922 
The Chicago Giants and Columbus Buckeyes fold.
The Cleveland Tate Stars and Pittsburgh Keystones join the NNL.
The Cincinnati Cuban Stars are renamed the Cuban Stars.
The St. Louis Giants are renamed the St. Louis Stars

1923: Founding of the Eastern Colored League 
The Eastern Colored League is established with six clubs.
The Pittsburgh Keystones folds.
Milwaukee joins the NNL.
The Cleveland Tate Stars depart from the NNL as an independent team and are replaced by the Toledo Tigers. The Tigers then folded midway through the 1923 season, and the Tate Stars returned to the NL to finish out the season.

1924 
Milwaukee folds.
Birmingham, the Cleveland Browns, and Memphis join the NNL.
Harrisburg and the Washington Potomacs join the ECL.

1925 
Cleveland Browns fold.
The Washington Potomacs move from Washington, D.C. to Wilmington, Delaware and are renamed the Wilmington Potomacs, before folding mid-season.

1926 
The Cleveland Elites join the NNL and fold mid-season.
The Dayton Marcos rejoin the NNL and depart mid-season as an independent team.
The Newark Stars join the ECL and fold mid-season.
Birmingham and Memphis depart the NNL and join the minor league Negro Southern League.

1927 
The Indianapolis ABCs fold.
Birmingham and Memphis rejoin the NNL.
The Cleveland Hornets join the NNL.

1928: Last ECL season 
The Eastern Colored League disbands mid-season.
The Cleveland Hornets fold.
Harrisburg and Hilldale withdraw from the ECL as independent teams.
The Cleveland Tigers join the NNL.
The Philadelphia Tigers joins the ECL.

1929: Only ANL season 
The American Negro League (not to be confused with the Negro American League) is formed with six clubs, consisting of five clubs from the former Eastern Colored League and the independent Homestead Grays.
The Cleveland Tigers fold.
The Philadelphia Tigers fold.
The Brooklyn Royal Giants becomes a permanent independent team.

1930 
The American Negro League disbands.
Atlantic City and the Cuban Stars (East) fold.
Baltimore, Hilldale, Homestead, and New York Lincoln become independent teams.
Louisville and Nashville join the NNL.

1931: Last NNL season 
The Cuban Stars folds.
Birmingham and Memphis depart the NNL and join the minor league Negro Southern League.
A new Indianapolis ABCs joins the NNL.
The Chicago American Giants are renamed the Chicago Columbia Giants
The Louisville Black Caps are renamed the Louisville White Sox
The Nashville Elite Giants move from Nashville, Tennessee to Cleveland, Ohio and are renamed the Cleveland Cubs.
The Negro National League disbands mid-season, though teams continue to play each other as independent teams.

1932: Only EWL season and major league NSL season 
The Negro National League disbands.
The East–West League is established with 8 clubs (3 of which (Baltimore, Hilldale, and Homestead) were members of the former American Negro League).
The minor league Negro Southern League is considered major league for the 1932 season, consisting of 10 clubs (6 of which (Atlanta, Birmingham, Chicago, Indianapolis, Memphis, Nashville) were members of the former Negro National League).
The Brooklyn Robins reverts back to the Brooklyn Dodgers name.
The Chicago Columbia Giants reverts back to the Chicago American Giants name.
The Newark Browns depart mid-season as an independent team.

1933: Establishment of second Negro National League 
The Negro Southern League (NSL) is considered demoted to minor league status.
Little Rock and Columbus of the NSL fold.
Monroe, Montgomery, and Memphis remain in the NSL and are therefore considered minor league teams.
Atlanta and Birmingham withdraw from MLB as independent teams.
The East-West League (EWL) disbands.
Cleveland, Detroit, Hilldale, and Newark of the EWL fold.
Pollock's Cuban Stars and Washington of the EWL withdraw from MLB as independent teams.
The Baltimore Black Sox are renamed as the Baltimore Sox.
The second Negro National League is formed, consisting of 7 clubs (5 of which (Baltimore, Chicago, Homestead, Indianapolis, and Nashville) were members of either the NSL or the EWL the previous year).
The Pittsburgh Crawfords joins the NNL.
The Indianapolis ABCs move mid-season from Indianapolis, Indiana to Detroit, Michigan and are renamed the Detroit Stars.
The Columbus Blue Birds of Columbus, Ohio rejoins MLB with the NNL. The team disbanded and merged with the independent Akron Black Tyrites of Akron, Ohio after the first half of the split season. Akron joins the NNL in place of Columbus before shortly moving to Cleveland, Ohio as the Cleveland Giants.

1934 
The Cleveland Giants and Detroit Stars fold.
Homestead withdraws from the league as an independent team.
The Cleveland Red Sox, Newark Dodgers, Philadelphia Bacharach Giants, and Philadelphia Stars join the NNL.
Baltimore reverts back to the Baltimore Black Sox name.

1935 
The Cleveland Red Sox fold.
The Baltimore Black Sox and Philadelphia Bacharach Giants withdraw from the league as independent teams.
The Brooklyn Eagles and New York Cubans join and the Homestead Grays rejoin the NNL.
The Nashville Elite Giants move from Nashville, Tennessee to Columbus, Ohio and are renamed the Columbus Elite Giants.

1936 
The Chicago American Giants withdraw from the NNL.
The Brooklyn Eagles and Newark Dodgers merge to form the Newark Eagles.
The New York Black Yankees join the NNL.
The Boston Braves are renamed the Boston Bees.
The Columbus Elite Giants move from Columbus, Ohio to Washington, D.C. and are renamed the Washington Elite Giants.

1937: Founding of the Negro American League 
The Negro American League (NAL) is formed, consisting of eight clubs (four of which were in previous Negro Major Leagues, including Birmingham, Chicago, Kansas City, and Memphis).
The New York Cubans withdraw from the NNL.

1938 
The Cincinnati Tigers, Detroit Stars, Indianapolis Athletics, St. Louis Stars fold.
Atlanta, a new Indianapolis ABCs, and Jacksonville join the NAL.
The Washington Black Senators join the NNL.
The Washington Elite Giants move from Washington, D.C. to Baltimore, Maryland and are renamed the Baltimore Elite Giants.

1939 
The Washington Black Senators fold.
Birmingham withdraws from the NAL and does not play during the 1939 season.
The New York Cubans rejoin the NNL.
The Indianapolis ABCs move from Indianapolis, Indiana to St. Louis, Missouri are renamed the St. Louis Stars.
The Atlanta Black Crackers move from Atlanta, Georgia to Indianapolis, Indiana and are renamed the Indianapolis ABCs.
The Jacksonville Red Caps move from Jacksonville, Florida to Cleveland, Ohio and are renamed the Cleveland Bears.
The Pittsburgh Crawfords move from Pittsburgh, Pennsylvania to Toledo, Ohio and are renamed the Toledo Crawfords.
Toledo withdraws from the NNL and join the NAL mid-season.

1940 
The Indianapolis ABCs fold.
Birmingham rejoins the NAL.
The St. Louis Stars split their home games between St. Louis, Missouri and New Orleans, Louisiana and are renamed the St. Louis–New Orleans Stars.
The Toledo Crawfords move from Toledo, Ohio to Indianapolis, Indiana and are renamed the Indianapolis Crawfords.

1941 
The Indianapolis Crawfords fold.
The Cleveland Bears move from Cleveland, Ohio back to Jacksonville, Florida and reverts its name back to the Jacksonville Red Caps
The Boston Bees reverts back to the Boston Braves name.

1942 
The St. Louis–New Orleans Stars temporarily disband.
The Cincinnati Buckeyes joins the NAL.
The Jacksonville Red Caps fold mid-season.

1943 
The St. Louis–New Orleans Stars reform and join the NNL as the Harrisburg–St. Louis Stars, having moved to Harrisburg, Pennsylvania, though keep the St. Louis moniker as a part of their name. The team would proceed to withdraw from the league in July to barnstorm before quickly folding for good.
The Cincinnati Buckeyes move from Cincinnati, Ohio to Cleveland, Ohio and are renamed the Cleveland Buckeyes.
The Cincinnati Clowns join the NAL.

1944 
The Cincinnati Clowns split their home games between Cincinnati, Ohio and Indianapolis, Indiana and are renamed the Cincinnati–Indianapolis Clowns.

1946 
The Cincinnati–Indianapolis Clowns cease playing in Cincinnati, Ohio and permanently play in Indianapolis, Indiana and are renamed the Indianapolis Clowns.

Integration, end of Negro Major Leagues, and Relocations begin (1947–1960)

1947 
The Brooklyn Dodgers, Cleveland Indians, and St. Louis Browns are the first teams in the MLB to integrate.

1948

1949 
Due to the ongoing process of integration, the Negro American League (NAL) reverts to minor league status, while the Negro National League (NNL) folds. All NNL teams (except for the collapsed New York Black Yankees and newly independent Homestead Grays) join the minor league NAL.
The New York Giants integrate.

1950 
The Boston Braves integrate.

1951 
The Chicago White Sox integrate.

1953: Braves relocation to Milwaukee, and Cincinnati renaming 
 The Boston Braves move to Milwaukee and become the Milwaukee Braves.
 The Cincinnati Reds are renamed the Cincinnati Redlegs.
 The Chicago Cubs, Philadelphia Athletics, and Pittsburgh Pirates integrate.

1954: Browns relocation to Baltimore 
The St. Louis Browns move to Baltimore and become the Baltimore Orioles.
The Cincinnati Redlegs, St. Louis Cardinals, and Washington Senators integrate.

1955: Athletics relocation to Kansas City 
The Philadelphia Athletics move to Kansas City, Missouri, and become the Kansas City Athletics.
The New York Yankees integrate.

1957 
The Philadelphia Phillies integrate.

1958: The NL exits New York for California 
The Brooklyn Dodgers move to Los Angeles and become the Los Angeles Dodgers.
The New York Giants move to San Francisco and become the San Francisco Giants.
The Detroit Tigers integrate.

1959: Cincinnati reverts back to the Reds 
After calling themselves the Cincinnati Redlegs for the past six seasons, the club reverts back to the Cincinnati Reds.
The Boston Red Sox are the final team to integrate.

First expansion (1961–1968)

1961 relocation and expansion 

 The Los Angeles Angels are enfranchised.
 The original Washington Senators move to the Minneapolis–Saint Paul area and are renamed the Minnesota Twins.
 A new Washington Senators club is enfranchised.

1962 expansion 

 The Houston Colt .45s are enfranchised.
 The New York Mets are enfranchised.

1965: Houston and Angels renaming 
 The Houston Colt .45s are renamed the Houston Astros.
 The Los Angeles Angels are renamed the California Angels on September 2, 1965, with 28 games left in the season.

1966: Braves relocation to Atlanta 
The Milwaukee Braves move to Atlanta and become the Atlanta Braves.

1968: Athletics relocation to Oakland 
The Kansas City Athletics move to Oakland, California, and become the Oakland Athletics.

Birth of division play (1969–1993)

1969 expansion and realignment 

 The Kansas City Royals and Seattle Pilots are enfranchised in the AL.
 The Montreal Expos and the San Diego Padres are enfranchised in the NL.
 The two leagues each realign into two six-team divisions

1970: Pilots relocation to Milwaukee 
The Seattle Pilots move to Milwaukee and become the Milwaukee Brewers.

1972: Senators relocation to the Dallas–Fort Worth metroplex 
 The Washington Senators move to Arlington, Texas, in the Dallas–Fort Worth metroplex and become the Texas Rangers.
 The Rangers transfer from the AL East to the AL West.
 The Milwaukee Brewers transfer from the AL West to the AL East.

1977 expansion 

 The Seattle Mariners are enfranchised and are placed in the AL West.
 The Toronto Blue Jays are enfranchised and are placed in the AL East.

1993 expansion 

 The Colorado Rockies are enfranchised and are placed in the NL West.
 The Florida Marlins are enfranchised and are placed in the NL East.

Wild Card era (1994–present)

1994 realignment 
MLB realigns to three divisions in each league to accommodate an expanded postseason format with a wild card team (although this new playoff format would not be fully implemented until 1995 due to a work stoppage):
 The AL Central is formed with Cleveland and Milwaukee transferring from the AL East; and the Chicago White Sox, Kansas City, and Minnesota from the AL West.
 The NL Central is formed with the Chicago Cubs, Pittsburgh, and St. Louis transferring from the NL East; and Cincinnati and Houston from the NL West.
 The Atlanta Braves transfer from the NL West to the NL East.

1997: Angels renaming 
The California Angels are renamed the Anaheim Angels.

1998 expansion 

 The Arizona Diamondbacks are enfranchised and are placed in the NL West.
 The Tampa Bay Devil Rays are enfranchised and are placed in the AL East.
 The Detroit Tigers transfer from the AL East to the AL Central.
 In order to primarily continue intraleague play, the Milwaukee Brewers transfer from the AL Central to the NL Central so both leagues each have an even number of teams.

2005: Expos relocation and Angels renaming 
 The Montreal Expos relocate to Washington, D.C. and become the Washington Nationals.
 The Anaheim Angels are renamed the Los Angeles Angels of Anaheim.

2008: Tampa Bay renaming 
The Tampa Bay Devil Rays shorten their name to Tampa Bay Rays.

2012: Marlins renaming 
The Florida Marlins are renamed the Miami Marlins.

2013: Astros switch leagues 
With interleague play expanded to occur throughout the season, the Houston Astros transfer from the NL Central to the AL West to accommodate each league with 15 clubs apiece.

2016: Angels renaming 
The Los Angeles Angels of Anaheim phase out the official use of "of Anaheim" in favor of just Los Angeles Angels.

2022: Cleveland renaming 
The Cleveland Indians are renamed the Cleveland Guardians.

See also 
 Timeline of Negro league baseball teams
 Timeline of the National Football League
 Timeline of the National Basketball Association
 History of organizational changes in the NHL

References

History of Major League Baseball
Articles which contain graphical timelines
Major League Baseball